Mennell is a surname. Notable people with the surname include:

Julie Mennell (born 1970), English academic
Laura Mennell (born 1980), Canadian actress
Nick Mennell (born 1976), American actor
Philip Mennell (1851–1905), British encyclopedist, journalist and newspaper owner
Stephen Mennell (born 1944), British sociologist